Manufacturers Hanover Corporation  was the bank holding company formed as parent of Manufacturers Hanover Trust Company, a large New York bank formed by a merger in 1961.  After 1969, Manufacturers Hanover Trust became a subsidiary of Manufacturers Hanover Corporation.  Charles J. Stewart was the company's first president and chairman.

The corporation acquired the former Union Carbide Corporation headquarters at 270 Park Avenue, and though it merged into Chemical Banking Corporation for $1.9 billion in 1991, the successor corporations down to today's J.P. Morgan Chase & Co. have continued to locate their headquarters in that building.

History

Manufacturers Trust Company
Manufacturers Hanover traces its origins to the 1905 founding of Citizens Trust Company of Brooklyn.  Through a series of acquisitions, the bank would grow into one of New York's largest banks within its first twenty years.  Citizens Trust's first major acquisitions came with its mergers with the Broadway Bank of Brooklyn in 1912 and then two years later with the Manufacturers National Bank of Brooklyn (1914).  In 1915, the bank adopted the older "Manufacturers" name, changing its name to the Manufacturers Trust Company.  The "Manufacturers" name had been in use since 1858, when the Mechanics' Bank of Williamsburgh (founded 1853) was renamed the Manufacturers National Bank.  Coincidentally, Manufacturers Trust Company had also been the name of a Brooklyn-based bank, founded in 1896 and acquired in 1902 by the Title Guarantee and Trust Company, another Brooklyn bank.

Manufacturers Trust acquired a Manhattan presence with its acquisition of the West Side Bank of New York in 1918.  Later Manufacturers Trust acquired the Ridgewood National Bank of Queens (1921), the North Side Bank of Brooklyn (1922), the Industrial Bank of New York (1922), the Columbia Bank of New York (1923), and the Yorkville Bank of New York (1925), to become the 29th largest bank in the United States by 1925.

In 1932, Manufacturers Trust created the National Hotel Management Company (NMH) to centrally oversee the hotels the bank held mortgages on. They appointed hotel pioneer Ralph Hitz as President of the NMH. This was because, even at the height of the Great Depression, Hitz had been able to turn a profit at the New Yorker Hotel, which the Manufacturers Trust also held the mortgage for. By the time of Hitz's death in 1940, the NHM had become the largest hotel organization in the United States and managed the New Yorker, the Lexington and the Belmont Plaza hotels (New York); the Congress Hotel (Chicago); the Netherland Plaza (Cincinnati); Adolphus Hotel (Dallas); the Van Cleve (Dayton); the Book-Cadillac  (Detroit); the Nicollet Hotel (Minneapolis); The New York Municipal Airport Restaurants (New York) and the Eastern Slope Inn (North Conway, New Hampshire).

The National Hotel Management Company was dissolved within a month of Hitz's death in 1940.

Continued consolidation (1961–1992)

In 1961, Manufacturers Trust Company merged with Central Hanover Bank & Trust Company (Hanover Trust) creating Manufacturers Hanover Trust Company.  The bank became the main source of financing for check cashing stores.  The bank reached its commercial heyday in the mid-1970s, when it ran a series of commercials that used the tagline, "It's banking the way you want it to be."  Twilight Zone writer Rod Serling and comedian Paul Lynde served as celebrity spokesmen.  At the same time, a Manufacturers Hanover billboard advertising "Super Checking" was a prominent feature of the newly renovated Yankee Stadium. The billboard could be seen as Chris Chambliss hit the home run that won the 1976 American League Championship Series for the New York Yankees over the Kansas City Royals.  Also during that period, Manufacturers Hanover heavily promoted its "Any Car" Loan using an "Any Car", known as the "FordChevAmChrysWagon", made up of parts from 40 different cars.

In 1987, the bank bought some of the branches of Dollar Dry Dock Savings Bank.  In 1992, it bought the New York City branches of the failed Goldome.  By 1992, it was running out of money due to savings account interest rates and bad loans.  On June 22 of that year, Chemical Bank purchased the operations of Manufacturers Hanover Trust Company, and on that day, Manufacturers Hanover ceased to exist.

Following the merger with Chemical, in 1996, the new Chemical bought Chase Manhattan Bank and four years later would merge with J.P. Morgan & Co. to form JPMorgan Chase.

Prior to acquisition, the bank was sometimes referred to as "Manny Hanny."

Timeline of mergers and name changes

The timeline below, unless otherwise noted, indicates the purchase of the named entity by Manufacturers Hanover Corporation or its immediate controlling predecessors. Exceptions include the first and last entries (original charter and dissolution of the company by buyout, respectively), and several name changes.
1905 – Citizens Trust Company of Brooklyn (original New York State charter, no direct predecessors)
1912 – Broadway Bank of Brooklyn
1914 – Manufacturers National Bank of Brooklyn, resulting in name change to Manufacturers-Citizens Trust Company
1915 – Name change to Manufacturers Trust Company (no merger involved)
1918 – West Side Bank
1921 – Ridgewood National Bank
1922 – North Side Bank of Brooklyn
1922 – Industrial Bank of New York
1923 – Columbia Bank
1925 – Yorkville Bank
1925 – Gotham National Bank
1925 – Fifth National Bank of the City of New York
1927 – Commonwealth Bank
1927 – Standard Bank
1928 – United Capitol National Bank and Trust Company
1929 – State Bank & Trust Company

1930 – Pacific Trust Company
1931 – Midtown Bank of New York
1931 – Bryant Park Bank
1931 – Midwood Trust Company
1932 – Chatham Phenix National Bank & Trust Company
1937 – Equitable Trust Company of New York (1930–1937)
1939 – Banca Commerciale Italiana Trust Co. of New York
1942 – Standard National Bank, Woodside, N.Y.
1946 – Flatbush National Bank of Brooklyn
1947 – Fidelity National Bank in New York, The
1949 – National Bronx Bank of New York
1950 – Brooklyn Trust Company
1953 – Peoples Industrial 
1961 – Central Hanover Bank & Trust Company, results in name change to Manufacturers Hanover Trust Company (parent named Manufacturers Hanover Corporation)
1991 – Goldome (assets)
1992 – Purchased by Chemical Bank, and ceases to exist

Central Hanover Bank & Trust Company 
The final name of the company was Manufacturers Hanover Corporation, and the primary banking subsidiary was Manufacturers Hanover Trust. This name was a result of the merger of predecessor Manufacturers Trust with Central Hanover Bank & Trust.

Central Hanover was also a large, well-known bank before the merger. It was formed in 1929 from the merger of two other banking giants of the time, Central Union Trust Company and Hanover National Bank.

Hanover National built one of the early skyscrapers of New York, the Hanover National Building at 11 Nassau Street. It had twenty-two floors and was 385 feet high.

The corporate history of predecessor Hanover Bank is as follows:

 1851 – Established Hanover Bank, NYS charter
 1865 – Name change to Hanover National Bank of the City of New York (Federal)
 1929 – Name change to Hanover Bank of the City of New York (NYS)
 1929 – Bought by Central Union Trust Company of New York (see below)

The corporate history of predecessor Central Union Trust Company is as follows:

 1873 – Established Central Trust Company of New York
 1901 – Continental National Bank of New York (est. 1853)
 1912 – Gallatin National Bank of the City of New York (est. 1829)
 1918 – Union Trust Company of New York; changed name to Central Union Trust Company of New York
 1927 – Greenwich National Bank of the City of New York (est. 1830)
 1929 – Hanover Bank of the City of New York; changed name to Central Hanover Bank and Trust Company
 1951 – Changed name to Hanover Bank (no merger)
 1961 – Bought by Manufacturers Trust Company

See also

List of bank mergers in the United States

References
Notes

Bibliography

The Bank Merger; Big Bank Merger to join Chemical, Manufacturers.  New York Times, July 16, 1991
Merging the Portfolios; New Chemical Bank to Have Big Amount of Real Estate Loans, and Their Troubles.  New York Times, July 18, 1991
Merger Announcement

Holding companies of the United States
Defunct banks of the United States
Defunct companies based in New York City
Banks based in New York City
American companies established in 1905
Holding companies established in 1905
Banks established in 1905
Banks disestablished in 1992
1905 establishments in New York City
1992 disestablishments in New York (state)
JPMorgan Chase
Companies formerly listed on the New York Stock Exchange
American companies disestablished in 1992
Holding companies disestablished in 1992